Châu Đốc is a city in An Giang Province, bordering Cambodia, in the Mekong Delta region of Vietnam.

The city is located by the Hậu River (a branch of the Mekong River flowing through Vietnamese territory) and Vĩnh Tế canal. It takes about six hours to travel by bus from Ho Chi Minh City.

History
The territory became Vietnam's around the 17th century. The town is near the picturesque Sam Mountain where the Sam Mountain Lady (Vietnamese: Bà Chúa Xứ Núi Sam) is worshipped. The Sam Mount Lady Ceremony is held every April of lunar calendar (May) every year.

Floods caused devastation in the region, the one in late 1938 saw 125,000 hectares of ruined riceland due to floods.

In 1957, the town was the site of the Châu Đốc massacre.

Climate
Châu Đốc has a tropical savanna climate (Köppen Aw) with a lengthy though not extreme wet season from April to November and a dry season from December to March.

Landmarks
The Phước Điền Temple is located in Châu Đốc. It is an official historic monument of Vietnam. The Victoria Hotel is the only notable hotel in the area. There are also many hotels in the center near the main market area, where you can get good value for money accommodation. There are other hotels that are situated near Nui Sam. There are a couple of new hotels on the road to Sam mountain. A worthwhile option to consider is a night (or two) on one of the floating hotels (there are 2, one reachable via footbridge, the other via boat).

Tây An Temple, dating from 1847, is near the city.

Population
Vietnamese, Cham and Khmer live together in harmony. The three main religions in this region are Mahayana Buddhism (Kinh/Vietnamese); Theravada Buddhism (Khmer), and Sunni Islam (Chams). The total population is around 120,000  with a vast majority of Kinh (Viet).

As of 2003 the district had a population of 112,155.

In July 2013, the city had a population of 157,298.

Economy

Châu Đốc is famous for its variety of fish sauces (nước mắm) and mainly "mắm tai", a kind of anchovy. The local economy is based on culture of basa catfish export and on tourism. The town is a busy trading center due to its border position with Cambodia.

Administrative subdivisions
Châu Đốc is subdivided to 7 commune-level subdivisions, including the wards of: Châu Phú A, Châu Phú B, Núi Sam, Vĩnh Mỹ, Vĩnh Nguơn and the rural communes of Vĩnh Châu and Vĩnh Tế.

Gallery

References

Bassac River
Districts of An Giang province
An Giang province
Populated places in An Giang province
Populated places on the Mekong River
Cities in Vietnam